Temnora rungwe is a moth of the family Sphingidae. It is known from Tanzania and Malawi.

It is very similar to Temnora burdoni, but the antennae are slightly shorter and the forewing outer margin is more strongly excavated below the apex and above the tornus.

References

Temnora
Moths described in 2004